Eupithecia gelidata is a moth of the family Geometridae. It is known from northern North America, Greenland, northern Russia, Scandinavia and northern central Europe.

The wingspan is 17–22 mm. There is one generation per year with adults on wing from June to mid July.

The larvae feed on Rhododendron tomentosum but possibly also other plants, because the species has been found in areas of Norway and Sweden where R. tomentosum is not present. Larvae can be found from mid July to August. It overwinters as a pupa.

Subspecies
Eupithecia gelidata gelidata
Eupithecia gelidata hyperboreata Staudinger, 1861 (Europe, northern Russia, Greenland)

References

Moths described in 1860
gelidata
Moths of North America
Moths of Europe